Food To Get You Laid was an American cooking and reality television show which first aired on the Logo TV cable channel on August 14, 2015. The series is hosted by celebrity chef Ronnie Woo.

Format
The show features Chef Ronnie Woo visiting the homes of couples and helping one of them cook a romantic meal while the other one is not home, only later to surprise them with an at-home date. The show features real life couples experiencing real relationship changes. Each episode focuses on a different couple trying to take their relationship to the next level through a three-course meal.

"I could have not asked for a better first season of Food To Get You Laid," Woo told The Huffington Post. "This show is very different from other cooking shows in so many ways and it's truly something I'm incredibly proud of. The message of the show is very near and dear to my heart and judging from the overwhelmingly positive feedback I received, I really believe that it resonated with the viewers. My biggest hope for viewers of this show after watching the season is that they are more motivated and fearless about getting in the kitchen and cooking for the people they love. Relationships are all about shared experiences and communication and food is the perfect way to create a conversation... and a memory."

Episodes

Season 1

Production 
The series was greenlit on June 1, 2015. The network ordered eight half-hour episodes; the production of Food To Get You Laid commenced immediately after the announcement. The show was originally set to premiere on Sunday, August 16, 2015, but was changed to Friday, August 14, 2015. The show is produced by Evan Prager and Jesse Ignjatovic from Den of Thieves, and Ilan Hall, Rich Kim, Kevin Johnston, and Roy Orecchio. The series is filmed in Los Angeles and is broadcast on Logo TV, an American cable network.

References

External links
 
 

2010s American cooking television series
English-language television shows
2015 American television series debuts
2010s American reality television series
Food reality television series
2015 American television series endings